Purani is a commune in Teleorman County, Muntenia, Romania. It is composed of two villages, Purani and Puranii de Sus. These were part of Siliștea Commune until 2004, when they were split off.

References

Communes in Teleorman County
Localities in Muntenia